Saint-Samuel is a municipality located in the Centre-du-Québec region of Quebec, Canada.

References

Municipalities in Quebec
Incorporated places in Centre-du-Québec